Mansudae Television is a state-owned educational television channel based in the Democratic People's Republic of Korea. It broadcasts programming every weekend with occasional advertising. Mansudae began transmissions on December 1, 1973, and broadcasts for three hours (19:00–22:00) on Saturdays, and nine hours (10:00–13:00, 16:00–22:00) on Sundays.

From its inception to July 13, 2015, broadcasting was carried out on channel 5 from the Pyongyang TV Tower and a special app on the Samjiyon tablet computer. In August 2016, the channel was added to the Manbang IPTV service, being available on the second button of the "Aircast" section.

Temporary closure 
In July 2015, Mansudae Television ceased broadcasting for unknown reasons. However, two reasons were considered in the Newstopia online edition (South Korea): According to one reason, this step could be taken by the North Korean authorities to restrict the access of Pyongyang residents to foreign content broadcast on the channel. According to the other, reported by Radio Free Asia, in the editorial board there was an incident with unfiltered content, shown on air on the channel. It was also reported that the launch of the broadcasting of the new Athletic Television, carried out on August 15 of the same year, was made at a frequency previously owned by Mansudae Television. As a result of internal checks of the government of North Korea, the television channel was rehabilitated only in 2016 (according to other sources - in November 2015). The message of South Korean news agency Yonhap from May 18, 2016, reported that access to the television channel was proposed to be carried out through cable networks.

Pay channel proposal 
In March 2018, Daily NK reported about the proposal by the North Korean government to convert the broadcasting of Mansudae Television on the principle of a paid subscription; however, according to the Daily NK, it was not established that the project is supposed to be carried out using traditional cable TV or Manbang IPTV. One of the main reasons for the decision of the North Korean government was the high popularity of films and programs that appear on the channel. The price was set at 650 won.

See also

Television in North Korea

References

Television channels in North Korea
Television channels and stations established in 1973
Television channels and stations disestablished in 2015
Television channels and stations established in 2015
Korean-language television stations